The Inspector of the Air Force is the commander of the Air Force of the modern-day German Armed Forces, the Bundeswehr. The Inspector is responsible for the readiness of personnel and materiel in the German Air Force, in that function reports directly to the Federal Minister of Defence. The current Inspector is Ingo Gerhartz, appointed on 29 May 2018.

The Inspector of the Air Force is the chief of the Air Force Command, based in Gatow, Berlin. They sit under the General Inspector of the Bundeswehr and are a member of the Defence Council for Bundeswehr-wide matters. Both the Inspector and their deputy hold the rank of lieutenant general while in office, although the first Inspector, Josef Kammhuber, was an exception, holding the rank of full general as a reward for his efforts to build up a new German Luftwaffe.

List of Inspectors of the Air Force

References

External links 
  Inspekteure der Luftwaffe (Bundesarchiv)

Bundeswehr
German Air Force
Air force commands of Germany
Germany